Nassacher Höhe is a mountain of Bavaria, Germany. The highest point of the Hassberge. It is 512 m above NN.

Mountains of Bavaria